Xieshan is a mountain resort in Gucheng County, Hubei province, China, 35 kilometers southwest of Xiangyang city. It was established by Western Protestant missionaries

References

Township-level divisions of Hubei
Tourist attractions in Hubei
Xiangyang